Heterospila is a genus of noctuoid moths in the family Erebidae. The genus was erected by Achille Guenée in 1852.

Species
 Heterospila fulgurea (Guenée 1852) — from the north-eastern Himalayas, Hainan, Thailand, Sumatra, Java, Borneo
 Heterospila nigripalpis (Walker 1869) — from India, Thailand, Sumatra, Borneo

References

Calpinae
Moth genera